, nicknamed "Taku", is a Japanese professional racing driver. He competes part-time in the IndyCar Series, driving the No. 11 Honda for Chip Ganassi Racing. Sato is a two-time winner of the Indianapolis 500, having won the event in 2017 and 2020. He was the first Asian driver to win the Indianapolis 500, and the twentieth driver to win the race more than once. Before winning the Indianapolis 500, Sato became the first Japanese-born driver to win an IndyCar Series race when he won the 2013 Grand Prix of Long Beach.

Sato raced full-time in the IndyCar Series from 2010 until 2022 for KV Racing Technology, Rahal Letterman Lanigan Racing, A. J. Foyt Enterprises, Andretti Autosport, and Dale Coyne Racing, all with Honda engines.

He competed in Formula One from 2002 to 2008 for the Honda-powered Jordan, BAR and Super Aguri teams, scoring 44 points overall, and a single podium which was at the 2004 United States Grand Prix. His 8th-place finish in the 2004 Formula One World Drivers' Championship is the best-ever result for a Japanese driver in the series.

Sato has become known among fans and media for his motto "no attack, no chance" with regards to his racing style.

Early career
Born in Tokyo, Sato began karting in Japan at the age of 19. After winning the national karting title in 1997, he moved to Europe with backing from Honda. He briefly raced in Vauxhall Junior and Formula Opel , before debuting in Class B of the British Formula 3 Championship mid-way through 1999 British Formula Three Championship with class wins at the British Grand Prix and Spa for Diamond Racing |1999]]. He moved to the top class of the championship with Carlin Motorsport in 2000, taking four wins and third place in the championship. In 2001, he won 12 out of 26 races to take a dominant championship win, the first for a Japanese driver in the series. In 2001 he also won the prestigious Macau Grand Prix and Masters of Formula 3 non-championship F3 races.

Formula One career

Jordan (2002)
In  Sato graduated to Formula One with the Honda-powered Jordan team, and was paired with Giancarlo Fisichella. His low point was a tremendous crash in Austria, caused when Nick Heidfeld lost control of his Sauber under braking and hit the side of Sato's car, punching a hole in the side of the cockpit. Throughout he showed flashes of speed but also wild driving, nevertheless the team's faith in Sato was repaid by a fine drive to fifth at his home Grand Prix in Suzuka.

BAR (2003–2005)

For the final round in Japan, Sato replaced Jacques Villeneuve and scored the second points finish of his career with sixth place, after a battle with Michael Schumacher. He was signed to race full-time in 2004. During the 2004 season, Sato qualified four times in the top-three, including a front row start and an overall lap record at the European Grand Prix. Reliability issues caused him to retire six times, but he scored points in nine of the 11 races he completed to finish eighth in the championship with 34 points, the best-ever result for a Japanese driver in Formula One. His efforts helped BAR-Honda to finish second in the Constructors' Championship.

Sato was retained by BAR-Honda for the 2005 season, but the 2005 car was not as close to the front of the pack as the previous year's design. The Court did not find that this was deliberate. Sato's season never recovered from that point, and he ended the season with eighth-place at the Hungarian Grand Prix as his only points finish, despite qualifying seven times in the top ten. Sato was not re-signed for 2006, despite Honda taking full control of the team.

Super Aguri (2006–2008)
The new outfit was in effect a Honda B-team but ran the first half of the season with a modified version of a 2002 Arrows A23 chassis. Nevertheless, Sato's reputation improved thanks to his professional attitude and competitive spirit. At the season finale in Brazil Sato finished tenth just two places short of a points finish and comfortably ahead of both Toro Rossos and the Spyker MF1s.

For 2007, Super Aguri ran a reworked version of the previous year's Honda RA106 chassis. He moved up five places in the last 15 laps, passing Toyota's Ralf Schumacher and then on lap 67 the McLaren-Mercedes of Fernando Alonso; the latter pass was met with cheers around the track and received him the "Overtake of the Year" award from F1 Racing magazine.

Financial problems began to affect the team in the off-season and the squad only just made it to the opening round of the  season in Australia. The team used a modified Honda RA107 chassis, which was launched just before the first Friday Practice session that weekend. A transmission issue in Australia ended an opportunity to score points in a race of attrition, and 13th in Spain turned out to be Sato's best result of the season. Due to the financial struggles, Super Aguri withdrew from Formula One after the Spanish Grand Prix, leaving Sato without a drive after four races in 2008.

In late 2008, Sato took part in tests at Jerez with Scuderia Toro Rosso, to become a candidate to fill the seat vacated by Sebastian Vettel. He was competing against former Toro Rosso driver Sébastien Bourdais and Red Bull Racing test and reserve driver Sébastien Buemi for one of the two race seats. He first drove on 18 September, more than four months since Super Aguri's withdrawal, and tested for the team again for two days in November, setting the fastest time on the 17th, 3 tenths ahead of Buemi, and proceeded by setting the second-fastest time on the 18th. The race seat was eventually given to Bourdais, and in March 2009 it was announced that Sato would not be the reserve driver for the Red Bull team.

IndyCar career

KV Racing Technology (2010–2011)

Sato visited the Indianapolis 500 in May 2009. He signed with KV Racing Technology to drive in the 2010 IndyCar Series season finishing in 21st place. He signed for the same team for 2011 and improved his form, scoring three top-five finishes and two pole positions during the season to finish 13th.

Rahal Letterman Lanigan Racing (2012)
At the 2012 Indianapolis 500, driving for Rahal Letterman Lanigan Racing, Sato chased Dario Franchitti to the finish making a move for the lead and the race win at the first turn of the last lap. While not successful, Sato was respected by Indianapolis 500 fans for "going for it" on the last lap.

A. J. Foyt Enterprises (2013–2016)

For 2013, Sato joined A. J. Foyt's team, driving the No. 14 car vacated by Mike Conway. In the third race of the season at Long Beach, Sato scored his first IndyCar win, in his 52nd start in the series, making him the first Japanese driver to win an IndyCar race. He then scored six top-five finishes, including two podiums and two pole positions, until he left the team at the end of 2016.

Andretti Autosport (2017)

Sato joined Andretti Autosport for the 2017 season. He went on to become the first Japanese driver to win the Indianapolis 500. After the 500 win, he went on to win a pole at the Dual in Detroit on Belle Isle. He also ended up winning another pole at Pocono Raceway in August.

Return to Rahal Letterman Lanigan Racing (2018–2021)
On 26 August 2017, it was reported that in 2018, Sato would rejoin RLL to drive the 30 car with Graham Rahal as his teammate as Andretti Autosport considered a move to Chevrolet in 2018. That move by Andretti subsequently did not happen. After numerous weeks of bad luck including crashing early in the Indianapolis 500 and wrecking early at Pocono and a failed pit strategy at Gateway, Sato played the strategy right and held off Ryan Hunter-Reay in the IndyCar return to Portland, winning his third career race and his first on a permanent road course, doing so from 20th starting position. Sato started his 2019 season with a win in the third race at Barber Motorsports Park; he started the race from pole position and ran away to the finish. Sato won later in the season at World Wide Technology Raceway at Gateway.

On 23 August 2020, after qualifying on the outside of the front row for the 104th running of the Indianapolis 500, Sato won the race for a second time.

On 5 October 2021, it was announced that Sato would not return to the team for the 2022 IndyCar season. His spot in the team was taken over by Danish driver, Christian Lundgaard.

Dale Coyne Racing (2022)

On 9 December 2021, it was announced that Sato had signed with Dale Coyne Racing with Rick Ware Racing for the 2022 season, replacing Romain Grosjean, who had signed with Andretti Autosport. He finished 25th at the Indianapolis 500.

Chip Ganassi Racing (2023-present) 
Chip Ganassi Racing signed Sato to run in the oval rounds 2023 season, making it the first time the Japanese driver not having a full-time IndyCar seat.

Other categories

Formula Nippon / Super Formula
On 14 June 2012, Team Mugen announced that Sato would race with the team in the last three rounds of the 2012 Formula Nippon season. He also raced with Team Mugen in the opening round of the renamed 2013 Super Formula season, and later in the year returned to the team to compete in the last three races of the season; he scored his first points with an eighth-place finish in the season finale.

Formula E
In November 2013, Sato became a test and development driver for the FIA Formula E Championship. In September 2014, Sato joined his former Formula One team Amlin Aguri to race in the first-ever Formula E race, the 2014 Beijing ePrix, replacing the team's regular driver Antonio Félix da Costa as he could not participate due to other commitments. Sato scored two points after he set the fastest lap of the race with a time of 1:45.101, but had to retire from the race with mechanical issues. As it was Sato's only Formula E race, he became the only driver in the series' history with a 100% fastest lap record.

Personal life
Sato is married to Chiharu Sato, with whom he has two children. He currently lives in Carmel, Indiana with his manager, Steve Fusek. Sato was a national cycling champion in high school, and still uses cycling as part of his physical training for his racing career.

Racing record

Career summary

* Season still in progress.

Complete Formula One results
(key) (Races in bold indicate pole position; races in italics indicate fastest lap)

† Did not finish the race, but was classified as he had completed more than 90% of the race distance.

American open–wheel racing
(key) (Races in bold indicate pole position; races in italics indicate fastest lap)

IndyCar Series

1 The 2011 Las Vegas Indy 300 was abandoned after Dan Wheldon died from injuries sustained in a 15-car crash on lap 11.

* Results as of August 7, 2022

Indianapolis 500

Complete FIA World Endurance Championship results

Complete Formula Nippon / Super Formula results

Complete Formula E results
(key) (Races in bold indicate pole position; races in italics indicate fastest lap)

See also
 Andrew Gilbert-Scott – his manager since his Junior Formula career in Europe until 2009
 Steve Fusek has been his manager since 2012.  Fusek is a long-time racing professional who has worked in IndyCar Racing since 1987.  He was VP of Business Operations at PacWest Racing Group from 1995-2001 as well as the VP of Sales and Marketing at CART from 2001-2003.

References

External links

 
 
 

1977 births
Living people
Sportspeople from Tokyo
Japanese racing drivers
Japanese Formula 3 Championship drivers
British Formula Three Championship drivers
Japanese Formula One drivers
Jordan Formula One drivers
BAR Formula One drivers
Super Aguri Formula One drivers
IndyCar Series drivers
Japanese IndyCar Series drivers
Indianapolis 500 drivers
Indianapolis 500 winners
FIA World Endurance Championship drivers
Formula Nippon drivers
Super Formula drivers
Formula E drivers
Carlin racing drivers
KV Racing Technology drivers
Rahal Letterman Lanigan Racing drivers
Mugen Motorsports drivers
A. J. Foyt Enterprises drivers
Andretti Autosport drivers
Japanese expatriate sportspeople in the United States
Dale Coyne Racing drivers
OAK Racing drivers
Chip Ganassi Racing drivers